Jennifer Elie (born September 22, 1986) is an American former professional tennis player.

She has career-high WTA rankings of 219 in singles, achieved June 2017, and 237 in doubles, set in May 2013. Elie has won two singles titles and six doubles titles on the ITF Circuit.

Jennifer was sponsored by several companies throughout her career, including Loriet Sports, a NY-born premium activewear brand.

Career
She made her main-draw debut on the WTA Tour at the 2012 Texas Open, partnering Asia Muhammad to reach the quarterfinals of the doubles tournament. The same year, she partnered Sesil Karatantcheva at the Bell Challenge; they lost their match of the first round.

During her career, she was coached by her father, Kerner Elie, and (so in her ITF profile) she preferred clay courts.

ITF Circuit finals

Singles: 9 (2 titles, 7 runner–ups)

Doubles: 11 (6 titles, 5 runner–ups)

References

External links
 
 

1986 births
Living people
American female tennis players
Sportspeople from New York City
Tennis people from New York (state)
African-American female tennis players
21st-century African-American sportspeople
21st-century African-American women
20th-century African-American people
20th-century African-American women